National Tertiary Route 717, or just Route 717 (or ) is a National Road Route of Costa Rica, located in the Alajuela province.

Description
In Alajuela province the route covers Grecia canton (Tacares, Puente de Piedra districts).

References

Highways in Costa Rica